Ramsdale may refer to:

 Ramsdale Beck, a small river on the North Yorkshire Coast
 Ramsdale Valley, a valley in Scarborough, England, spanned by Valley Bridge
 Aaron Ramsdale (born 1998), English footballer
 Dick Ramsdale (1885-1933), English rugby player

See also 
 Ramsdell (disambiguation)